Floridaland was a tourist attraction located between Sarasota and Venice, Florida on US highway 41. It opened December 25, 1964 and closed on July 2, 1971. It boasted "Everything Under The Sun!" and "10 Big Attractions for One Low Price." Attractions included a petting zoo, dolphin show, and old west style main street featuring can-can girls performing at the Gold Nugget Saloon, and a gun fight and stunt show that took place several times a day.

References 

Defunct amusement parks in Florida
1964 establishments in Florida
1971 disestablishments in Florida
Amusement parks opened in 1964
Amusement parks closed in 1971